The Room in the Elephant is a restaurant in Torquay, Devon, England. , the restaurant holds one star in the Michelin Guide.

See also
 List of Michelin starred restaurants

References 

Restaurants in Devon
Michelin Guide starred restaurants in the United Kingdom
Torquay